Start at the Top is a compilation album by American rock band Skin Yard, released in 2001 by C/Z Records.

Overview
The album is a hand-numbered limited release CD compiling a number of never-before-heard tracks and several previously vinyl-only recordings. Included are Skin Yard's Sub Pop single, their "Stranger" single (on Toxic Shock Records), "Machine Gun Etiquette" from The Damned covers comp., and Ace Frehley's "Snow Blind" from the KISS compilation (also on C/Z Records).

Track listing
"Start at the Top" (House, McMillan) - 3:06
"Watch" (McMillan) - 3:24
"Jump the Wall (Gentle Collapse)" (Endino, House, McMillan) - 6:22
"Machine Gun Etiquette" (The Damned) - 1:41
"Twelve Points" (Endino, House) - 3:39
"Make Room" (McMillan, Skin Yard) - 3:05
"Snow Blind" (Ace Frehley) - 3:57
"Hey Bulldog (Alternate version)" (Lennon-McCartney) - 3:12
"This Lonely Place" (House, McMillan) - 4:47
"NWAP II" (Skin Yard) - 2:06
"The Ha-Ha" (House) - 2:28
"No Right (Jason version)" (Endino, House, McMillan) - 7:50

Personnel
Musical
Ben McMillan - vocals
Jack Endino - guitar
Daniel House - bass
Jason Finn - drums
Barrett Martin - drums
Matt Cameron - drums
Scott McCullum - drums
Production
Ken Kelly - cover painting
Gary Bedell - graphic design, photography
Arthur Aubry - photography

References

External links
Production Details at Endino.com

Skin Yard albums
2001 compilation albums
Albums produced by Matt Cameron